SS Stephano was a passenger liner and sealing ship, owned by Bowring Brothers and operated in their Red Cross Line of Arctic steamships. Stephano is most notable for her role in the 1914  Sealing Disaster, under the command of Captain Abram Kean.

History

Early career
Stephano served in Bowring Brothers' Red Cross Line as a passenger steamer, and cargo vessel, between New York City and St. John's, Newfoundland, from 1911 until her sinking in 1916.

1914 Newfoundland Sealing Disaster
During the 1914 sealing season, Stephano was under the command of Captain Abram Kean, a renowned sealing captain with a reputation of bringing home record breaking hauls of seal.

After becoming stuck in the ice, Westbury Kean ordered his crew onto the ice to travel to the Stephano. Upon reaching the Stephano, the crew of the Newfoundland were welcomed onboard and fed lunch. Abram Kean then moved the Stephano to a pack of seals and ordered the Newfoundland crew over the side. Kean left the crew and the Stephano traveled elsewhere. The crew of the Newfoundland were left on the ice for two days and nights, during a major storm, resulting in the deaths of 77 men.

First World War

Sinking
As a result, the vessel sunk; however, there were no casualties of the 94 passengers. Stephano was one of five vessels sunk by U-53 that day.

References

External link

Troop ships of the United Kingdom
Shipwrecks of the Massachusetts coast
Sealing ships